Nimbic, Inc. (formerly Physware) was a company that developed Electronic Design Automation (EDA) software. The company was founded in 2006 and was headquartered in Mountain View, California, United States.

Nimbic offered high speed 3D Electromagnetic Simulation  solutions for Signal integrity (SI), Power integrity (PI), Integrity to Electromagnetic Interference (EMI) and Simultaneous Switching Noise/Simultaneous Switching Output (SSN/SSO) Integrity. They also offered secure Cloud Computing solutions for electronic design.  Nimbic was acquired by Mentor Graphics, which was in turn acquired by Siemens and rebranded Siemens EDA.

Portfolio 

Nimbic develops 3D broadband electromagnetic field extractors and simulators for Signal Integrity, Power Integrity, EMI Analysis and SSN/SSO Analysis.  Their product range includes:

 nWave 
 nApex 
 nVolt 
 nCloud

History 
Nimbic (formerly Physware) was founded in December 2006 by Dr. Vikram Jandhyala.

In May 2010, Physware was named "2010 Cool Vendor in Semiconductors" by Gartner.

It was acquired by Mentor Graphics in 2014.

References

External links
 Official Website

Companies based in Mountain View, California
Companies established in 2006
Electronic design automation companies
Electronic design automation software